The Old Rectory in Yatton, Somerset, England, was a Prebendary house, built in the 15th century and has been designated as a Grade I listed building.

Over the years it has undergone a range of alterations including a mid 19th century rear wing. It is now separated into 2 houses which are occupied separately.

See also

 List of Grade I listed buildings in North Somerset

References

Houses completed in the 15th century
15th-century religious buildings and structures
Grade I listed buildings in North Somerset
Grade I listed houses in Somerset